Anthony Mawejje Jr. (born 15 December 1986) is a Ugandan international former footballer who used to play as a midfielder for Police FC  in the Uganda Premier League.

Club career 

Mawejje previously signed a two-year contract with the Norwegian Tippeligaen club Haugesund ahead of the 2014 season. In July 2014, after only three appearances for Haugesund, Mawejje moved to Valur on loan. On 27 January 2015, Mawejje became a free agent.

Tirana
In July Mawejje joined Tirana in Albania and made his debut on 6 September 2017 in a win against FK Kukësi where he played the entire match. Tony scored his first goal for  Tirana on 16 September 2017 against KS Iliria; Tirana won 1–0.

Career statistics

Club

International statistics

Statistics accurate as of match played 4 June 2016

International goals

Scores and results list Uganda's goal tally first.

Honours

Club

Tirana
 Albanian Supercup: (1) 2017
 Albanian First Division : Winner Group B
 Albanian First Division : 2017-2018

References

External links
 
 
 Video album at Vimeo
 

1986 births
Living people
Ugandan footballers
Uganda international footballers
Association football midfielders
Lamontville Golden Arrows F.C. players
Íþróttabandalag Vestmannaeyja players
FK Haugesund players

Ugandan expatriate footballers
Expatriate footballers in Iceland
Expatriate footballers in Norway
Kampala Capital City Authority FC players
Ugandan expatriate sportspeople in Iceland
Ugandan expatriate sportspeople in Norway
2017 Africa Cup of Nations players
Kategoria e Parë players
People from Masaka District
Uganda A' international footballers
2020 African Nations Championship players
Ugandan expatriate sportspeople in Albania
Ugandan expatriate sportspeople in South Africa
Ugandan expatriate sportspeople in Kuwait
KF Tirana players
Al-Arabi SC (Kuwait) players
Police FC (Uganda) players
Expatriate soccer players in South Africa
Expatriate footballers in Kuwait
Expatriate footballers in Albania